Barnett v Chelsea & Kensington Hospital Management Committee [1968] 2 WLR 422 is an English tort law case that applies the "but for" test of causation.

Facts
After their night shift as night-watchmen, at about 8am on 1 January 1966, three people went to the emergency department of the hospital run by the Chelsea & Kensington Hospital Management Committee. (They had actually already visited this hospital at about 4am because an intruder had struck one of them in the head with an iron bar.) They spoke to a nurse and told her that they had been vomiting since drinking tea at about 5am. The casualty officer, Dr. Banerjee, did not see them. He advised the nurse, over the phone, that they should go home and call their own doctors. One of them, Mr. Barnett, died about five hours later from arsenic poisoning. Mrs. Barnett sued the hospital for negligence.

Judgment
The judge held that the hospital was not liable. Even if they were to have admitted Mr. Barnett, there would have been little or no chance that the antidote would have been administered to him in time to prevent his death. Although the hospital had breached the standard of care, that breach was held to not be a cause of Mr. Barnett's death.

References

See also
 Negligence

English tort case law
English causation case law
1968 in case law
1968 in British law